Pedro Henrique Nogueira Beda (born March 5, 1989) is a Brazilian footballer who plays in Spain, as a forward for Arosa SC.

Club career
Born in Aquidauana, Mato Grosso do Sul, Beda joined Flamengo's youth setup in 2002, aged 13, after starting it out at lowly locals SEDUC. He progressed through the ranks, being always top scorer, but failed to make a first team appearance for the club.

On 3 June 2008, Beda signed a two-year deal with Eredivisie club SC Heerenveen, for an undisclosed fee. He played his first match as a professional on 27 September 2008, coming on as a late substitute in a 2–4 away loss against NAC Breda.

In June 2009 Beda was loaned to FC Emmen, in a season-long deal. He appeared in 17 matches during the campaign, scoring three goals.

On 15 October 2010 Beda returned to Brazil, signing a short-term deal with Corinthians. He then moved to Bahia in January 2011 in a temporary deal, but was released on 1 June, after appearing sparingly.

On 2 March 2012 Beda joined Avenida, playing with the club in Campeonato Gaúcho. On 3 July he switched teams and countries again, signing a one-year deal with Moreirense F.C., freshly promoted to Primeira Liga.

Beda appeared in the whole pre-season with the Minho outfit, but left the club in August after alleging personal problems. On 3 January 2013 he joined Ríver in his homeland, but left the club two months later, again for personal reasons.

In February 2014 Pedro Beda signed a contract with Premier League of Bosnia and Herzegovina's FK Rudar Prijedor, after having a short stint at OC Khouribga in Morocco. He appeared in five matches for the club, and moved to Spanish Segunda División B side Lucena CF on 24 June.

References

External links

1989 births
Living people
Sportspeople from Mato Grosso do Sul
Brazilian footballers
Association football forwards
Eredivisie players
Eerste Divisie players
SC Heerenveen players
FC Emmen players
Sport Club Corinthians Paulista players
Esporte Clube Bahia players
Moreirense F.C. players
FK Rudar Prijedor players
Segunda División B players
Lucena CF players
CD Lealtad players

CF Villanovense players

Brazilian expatriate footballers
Brazilian expatriate sportspeople in the Netherlands
Expatriate footballers in the Netherlands
Brazilian expatriate sportspeople in Portugal
Expatriate footballers in Portugal
Brazilian expatriate sportspeople in Morocco
Expatriate footballers in Morocco
Brazilian expatriate sportspeople in Bosnia and Herzegovina
Expatriate footballers in Bosnia and Herzegovina
Brazilian expatriate sportspeople in Spain
Expatriate footballers in Spain
Olympique Club de Khouribga players